Chara M. Curtis is a writer and children's book author from Minnesota.

Biography 
Chara Mahar Curtis was born in Minnesota, worked in advertising and music publishing in Chicago and Nashville before becoming a full-time writer.

Chara has lived in a variety of places, including northern Wisconsin, Nashville, Chicago, and Istanbul. She now makes her home near the San Juan Islands of Washington.

She is a daughter of Radio/TV News & Sports personality Harold Richard "Dick" Eugene Mahar and Gloria Estelle LaValleur Mahar Shemorry and has six siblings (in order of age): Richard, Pamela, Jennifer, twins Debra & Douglas, and Bonnie.

Bibliography 
How Far to Heaven(1993)
All I See Is Part of Me (1994)
No One Walks on My Father's Moon/ (1996) Voyage Publishing 
Fun Is a Feeling(1998)

Awards 
1996 Body Mind Spirit Magazine Award of Excellence for All I See is Part of Me
1997 Washington State Governor's Writers Award for No One Walks on My Father's Moon

References

External links 
Biography at Illumination Arts

Year of birth missing (living people)
Living people
20th-century American women writers
20th-century American writers
21st-century American women
Writers from Minnesota